Keavy is an unincorporated community in Laurel County, Kentucky, in the United States. Keavy has its own post office with the zip code 40737.

Keavy was named after a shoe brand.

Keavy is the birthplace of former Auburn University, and current Las Vegas Raiders quarterback Jarrett Stidham.

References

Unincorporated communities in Laurel County, Kentucky
Unincorporated communities in Kentucky